Øivind Sigvart Jorfald (born 8 September 1950) is a Norwegian cartoonist, visual artist, illustrator and animator, based in Asker.

Øivind S. Jorfald mainly works in hand coloured engravings, lithography and drawings/watercolor paintings. His pictures are mostly small and of a humorous nature. The sea and women are repeating motifs in his pictures. He has also illustrated a number of books, mostly children's books. Øivind Jorfald has also made a number of animated films, including Steinen, for which he won an Amanda Award in 1990. In 1981, he released the book Bygging av flaskeskuter.

External links
 Øivind S. Jorfald's CV at the Kunstnernes informasjonskontor
 Hebbe Lille's Gallery, with a number of examples of Øivind S. Jorfald's work
 Øivind Jorfald's activity as an animator

Norwegian artists
Norwegian male artists
Norwegian animators
Norwegian animated film directors
Norwegian cartoonists
20th-century Norwegian painters
21st-century Norwegian painters
1950 births
Living people
20th-century Norwegian male artists
21st-century Norwegian male artists